Yevgeny Ilyich Ostashev (22 March 1924 – 24 October 1960), was the test pilot of rocket and space complexes, participant in the launch of the first artificial Earth satellite, head of the 1st control polygon NIIP-5 (Baikonur), Lenin prize winner, Candidate of Technical Sciences, engineer-podpolkovnik.

Biography
Born 22 March 1924 in the village Maly Vasilyev, Noginsky District, Moscow Oblast, USSR. In 1941, he entered the Moscow Aviation Institute, but refused to evacuate to Alma-Ata with the rest of the institute's staff after the outbreak of war, deciding instead to work at a local factory until he was drafted into the Red Army in the summer of 1942. He was drafted into the army in the summer of 1942, became a cadet of the Leningrad artillery school. After six months of training in the rank of second lieutenant, he was sent to the Stalingrad front  as a commander of a communications platoon in a  mortar regiment.

He fought as part of the unit which was part of the 1st Ukrainian front  under the command of the Century V.I. Chuikov. The commander of the mortar platoon took part in the Korsun-Shevchenko operation, in the battles on the Dniester, near Vitebsk was part of the 1st Belorussian front. In the operation to take Berlin participated as a commander of a mortar company. At the end of the war remained in the occupation of Germany.
In 1949 he entered the 6th Department of the Artillery Academy named after F. E. Dzerzhinsky on a speciality «missiles». In the spring of 1955 graduated with honors, from the proposals remain in the graduate refused. Was appointed Deputy chief of the Department of complex tests of rockets R-7 (11-th Department) to the landfill NIIP-5 of the Ministry of defense  of the USSR.

He passed training at the industrial enterprises and 4 STP, the NIIP-5 arrived trained specialist. In 11-th division headed the Department of tests management system (SU), automatics missiles knew not worse developers from OKB-1  and NII-885. Since the launch of the first satellite, was the «firing» of the military test polygon. In March 1960 he was appointed the first chief formed the 1st control NIIP-5 (military unit 44275) for testing and operation of rockets R-7, R-9  on low-boiling propellant components.

Interesting fact
In the school years, together with his younger brother Arkady, under the leadership of the magazine Knowledge is power  built a telescope with a 10-fold increase with the necessary bed and a mechanism of rotation in two planes, lenses for the eyepiece and the objective sent to the editorial Board of the journal free of charge. It observed the Moon , they dreamed of flying to the planets of the Solar System.

Death

 
Ostashev died on 24 October 1960 in Baikonur at explosion of the missile R-16 during its preparation for the test launch on 41 site  landfill. Tests of the R-16 engaged in the 2nd control NIIP-5, and Yevgeny Ilyich established in connection with failure of the rocket situation tried to provide assistance to their colleagues. Total killed 78 people. The incident was strictly classified (only in 1995 materials about the tragedy became available to all), it was officially announced about the death of only Chief Marshal of Artillery Nedelin, in a plane crash. From the memories younger brother Arkady Ostashev:
"...10 days before the death of Yevgeny I was at head of the polygon, the commander of the NIIP-5 Konstantin Vasilyevich Gerchik. He informed me that the order came on early assignment Eugene next rank of Colonel. Decided to tell him about it at the solemn meeting in honor of the 7 November. And before that, Eugene announced that he was appointed Deputy Director of NIIP-5 on scientific work instead A.I. Nosova, serving on service in Moscow..." (RGANTD. F. 33 op. 1 deeds 338 )
He is buried in Baikonur in the mass grave for victims of explosion of an Intercontinental ballistic missile R-16.

Awards
 Lenin Prize
 Order of the Patriotic War 1st and 2nd class
 Order of the Red Star
 Medal "For Battle Merit"
 Order of Courage (posthumous)
 campaign and jubilee medals

Memory
Name Ostasheva is one of the streets   of Baikonur. The decree of the Head of the city administration, Baikonur (city) № 183 of 30 May 2001 E. I. Ostashevu awarded the title of «Honorary citizen of the city of Baikonur» . In Elektrougli Noginsk district of Moscow region in the regional Museum there is a booth dedicated to the brothers Осташевым. On the house number 17  in the village of Small Vasilyev, where they lived in childhood brothers Осташевы, a memorial plaque. In the city Park city Elektrougli a memorial plate to the head of test management Baikonur – Ostashev E. I.   In the Museum of the strategic missile forces in Vlasikha, Moscow hosted the exhibition is devoted to E. I. Ostaszewo in the sections on world war II and the development of space industry in the country.

References

Literature 

 "Korolev: Facts and myths" – J. K. Golovanov, M: Nauka, 1994. 
 "Rockets and people" – B. E. Chertok, M: "mechanical engineering", 1999.  ;
 «A breakthrough in space» – Konstantin Vasilyevich Gerchik, M: LLC "Veles", 1994. 
 «At risk» – A. A. Toul, Kaluga, "the Golden path", 2001. 
 "People duty and honor" – A. A. Shmelev, the second book. M: Editorial Board "Moscow journal", 1998.
 "Testing of rocket and space technology – the business of my life" Events and facts – A.I. Ostashev, Korolyov, 2001.
 "Baikonur. Korolev. Yangel." – M. I. Kuznetsk, Voronezh: IPF "Voronezh", 1997, 
 A.I. Ostashev, Sergey Pavlovich Korolyov – The Genius of the 20th Century — 2010 M. of Public Educational Institution of Higher Professional Training MGUL .
 "Look back and look ahead. Notes of a military engineer" – Rjazhsky A. A., 2004, SC. first, the publishing house of the "Heroes of the Fatherland" .
 "Unknown Baikonur" – edited by B. I. Posysaeva, M.: "globe", 2001. 
 "Melua, A.I." " Rocket technology, cosmonautics and artillery. Biographies of scientists and specialists.- 2nd ed., supplement, St. Petersburg: "Humanistics", 2005. С. 355. ISBN 5-86050-243-5 
 "Rocket and space feat Baikonur" – Vladimir Порошков, the "Patriot" publishers 2007. 
 "Bank of the Universe" – edited by Boltenko A. C., Kiev, 2014., publishing house "Phoenix", 
 "Nesterenko" series Lives of great people – Authors: Gregory Sukhina A., Ivkin, Vladimir Ivanovich, publishing house "Young guard" in 2015, 
 "To stand on the way to space"  – Author: Valentin Lebedev, M: publisher ITRK in 2016, 
 "We grew hearts in Baikonur" – Author: Eliseev V. I. M: publisher OAO MPK in 2018, 
 "Flight tests of rocket and space technology. Time. Spaceports. People. " - Author: Posysaev Boris Ivanovich Mozhaisk: publisher Mozhaisk printing plant, 2020. 
 "I look back and have no regrets. " - Author: Abramov, Anatoly Petrovich: publisher "New format" Barnaul, 2022.

External links 

 Bondarev Yu. F. Memories of service at Baikonur (Rus.). Of. the website of Roskosmos. Archived.
 The Baikonur cosmodrome (Rus.). The Site "Baikonur-Info". Archived.
 A. Zheleznyakov. Baikonurskaya tragedy.  Archived.  Archived.
 Harford, James. Korolev – How One Man Masterminded the Soviet Drive to Beat America to the Moon. John Wiley & Sons, Inc., New York, 1997. pp 119–120. 
 "Red Moon Rising: Sputnik and the Hidden Rivalries that Ignited the Space Age", – Matthew Brzezinski, Henry Holt and Company, 2008 г. 
  Ostashev E.I. on page «Cosmic memorial» 
 Strategic rocket forces. Reference. History. 
 Electronic newspaper Elektrougli
 Calendar Encyclopedia of cosmonautics A. Zheleznyakov.
 Brothers Ostashev from Elektrougli // "news Agency suburbs" 
 Famous people of the city of Elektrogli
 the official website of the city administration Baikonur – Honorary citizens of Baikonur
 
 
 Photo of pokoritelya space
 Look back and look ahead
 
 Yevgeny Ostashev //Family history 
 E. I. Ostashev electronic memorial
 Baikonur tragedy// Encyclopedia Of "Space". 
 Nedelin Disaster // RussianSpaceWeb.com 
 Video Cosmos 
 Information and law portal-OFFICERS of RUSSIA//Memorial day missile 
 The website of the Ministry of Defense of the Russian Federation//Yevgeny Ostashev 
 The newspaper Moskovsky Komsomolets  // The disaster at Baikonur 
 Lenta.ru // Spetsproekt Win.
 The Russian Union Of Veterans // Day of memory and grief.
 The official website of the city administration Baikonur // Baikonur commemorated a test rocket and space technology.
 Space feat Eugene Ostasheva//Newspaper "ELEKTROUGLI DAY by DAY" 12/04/2011.
 Military community // 24 October, the Day of remembrance of the victims of the missile.
 
 For the 50th anniversary of the flight of Yuri Gagarin //Press note No. 3 |Jan – APR| 2011. 
 "Academic Bulletin" 2012, No. 109

1924 births
1960 deaths
Soviet people of World War II
Soviet aerospace engineers
20th-century Russian engineers
Russian military engineers
Lenin Prize winners
Recipients of the Order of Courage
Baikonur Cosmodrome
Russian aerospace engineers
Accidental deaths in the Soviet Union